The 2004–05 Boston Bruins season was the Bruins' 81st National Hockey League season, its games were cancelled as the 2004–05 NHL lockout could not be resolved in time.

Off-season
The Bruins selected David Krejci as their first pick in the 2004 NHL Entry Draft, 63rd overall in the second round.

Schedule
The Bruins preseason and regular season schedules were announced on July 14, 2004.

|-
| 1 || September 24 || @ Pittsburgh Penguins
|-
| 2 || September 26 || @ Detroit Red Wings
|-
| 3 || September 28 || @ Montreal Canadiens
|-
| 4 || September 29 || @ Montreal Canadiens
|-
| 5 || September 30 || Detroit Red Wings
|-
| 6 || October 2 || New York Rangers
|-
| 7 || October 5 || @ New York Rangers
|-
| 8 || October 9 || New York Islanders
|-

|-
| 1 || October 16 || @ Dallas Stars
|-
| 2 || October 17 || @ Colorado Avalanche
|-
| 3 || October 19 || @ New York Islanders
|-
| 4 || October 21 || Florida Panthers
|-
| 5 || October 23 || San Jose Sharks
|-
| 6 || October 28 || New York Islanders
|-
| 7 || October 30 || Mighty Ducks of Anaheim
|-
| 8 || November 1 || @ Ottawa Senators
|-
| 9 || November 3 || @ New York Rangers
|-
| 10 || November 4 || Buffalo Sabres
|-
| 11 || November 6 || @ Toronto Maple Leafs
|-
| 12 || November 11 || @ Philadelphia Flyers
|-
| 13 || November 13 || Toronto Maple Leafs
|-
| 14 || November 16 || @ Montreal Canadiens
|-
| 15 || November 18 || Tampa Bay Lightning
|-
| 16 || November 20 || Atlanta Thrashers
|-
| 17 || November 24 || @ Buffalo Sabres
|-
| 18 || November 26 || Ottawa Senators
|-
| 19 || November 27 || @ Montreal Canadiens
|-
| 20 || December 1 || @ Carolina Hurricanes
|-
| 21 || December 2|| Ottawa Senators
|-
| 22 || December 4 || Montreal Canadiens
|-
| 23 || December 7 || @ Toronto Maple Leafs
|-
| 24 || December 9 || @ Buffalo Sabres
|-
| 25 || December 11 || Buffalo Sabres
|-
| 26 || December 12 || @ New York Rangers
|-
| 27 || December 15 || @ Philadelphia Flyers
|-
| 28 || December 16 || Philadelphia Flyers
|-
| 29 || December 18 || @ Ottawa Senators
|-
| 30 || December 21 || Toronto Maple Leafs
|-
| 31 || December 23 || St. Louis Blues
|-
| 32 || December 27 || @ Tampa Bay Lightning
|-
| 33 || December 29 || @ Florida Panthers
|-
| 34 || December 31 || @ Pittsburgh Penguins
|-
| 35 || January 1 || Toronto Maple Leafs
|-
| 36 || January 4 || @ Toronto Maple Leafs
|-
| 37 || January 6 || Montreal Canadiens
|-
| 38 || January 8 || New York Rangers
|-
| 39 || January 11 || Detroit Red Wings
|-
| 40 || January 14 || @ New Jersey Devils
|-
| 41 || January 15 || New Jersey Devils
|-
| 42 || January 17 || Colorado Avalanche
|-
| 43 || January 19 || @ Tampa Bay Lightning
|-
| 44 || January 21 || @ Florida Panthers
|-
| 45 || January 24 || Florida Panthers
|-
| 46 || January 27 || Washington Capitals
|-
| 47 || January 29 || Tampa Bay Lightning
|-
| 48 || January 30 || Buffalo Sabres
|-
| 49 || February 1 || @ Montreal Canadiens
|-
| 50 || February 3 || Los Angeles Kings
|-
| 51 || February 5 || Chicago Blackhawks
|-
| 52 || February 6 || @ Washington Capitals
|-
| 53 || February 8 || @ Atlanta Thrashers
|-
| 54 || February 10 || Montreal Canadiens
|-
| 55 || February 15 || Washington Capitals
|-
| 56 || February 17 || @ Phoenix Coyotes
|-
| 57 || February 19 || @ San Jose Sharks
|-
| 58 || February 22 || @ Vancouver Canucks
|-
| 59 || February 25 || @ Edmonton Oilers
|-
| 60 || February 26 || @ Calgary Flames
|-
| 61 || February 28 || New York Islanders
|-
| 62 || March 2 || @ New Jersey Devils
|-
| 63 || March 3 || @ Ottawa Senators
|-
| 64 || March 5 || Philadelphia Flyers
|-
| 65 || March 7 || Columbus Blue Jackets
|-
| 66 || March 9 || @ Buffalo Sabres
|-
| 67 || March 10 || Pittsburgh Penguins
|-
| 68 || March 13 || @ New York Islanders
|-
| 69 || March 15 || @ Atlanta Thrashers
|-
| 70 || March 17 || Nashville Predators
|-
| 71 || March 19 || Carolina Hurricanes
|-
| 72 || March 21 || Ottawa Senators
|-
| 73 || March 23 || @ Columbus Blue Jackets
|-
| 74 || March 24 || @ Carolina Hurricanes
|-
| 75 || March 26 || @ Minnesota Wild
|-
| 76 || March 28 || Carolina Hurricanes
|-
| 77 || March 31 || @ Washington Capitals
|-
| 78 || April 2 || New Jersey Devils
|-
| 79 || April 4 || Atlanta Thrashers
|-
| 80 || April 7 || Pittsburgh Penguins
|-
| 81 || April 9 || New York Rangers
|-
| 82 || April 10 || @ Pittsburgh Penguins
|-

Transactions
The Bruins were involved in the following transactions from June 8, 2004, the day after the deciding game of the 2004 Stanley Cup Finals, through February 16, 2005, the day the  season was officially cancelled.

Trades

Players acquired

Players lost

Signings

Draft picks
Boston's picks at the 2004 NHL Entry Draft, which was held at the RBC Center in Raleigh, North Carolina on June 26–27, 2004.

Farm teams

Notes

References

Boston Bruins
Boston Bruins
Boston Bruins seasons
Boston Bruins
Boston Bruins
Bruins
Bruins